The Advanced Towed Artillery Gun System (ATAGS) is a towed 155 mm/52 calibre howitzer that is being developed for the Indian Army by Armament Research and Development Establishment (ARDE), Tata Advanced Systems and Kalyani Strategic Systems. Bharat Forge, Tata Power SED and Advanced Weapons and Equipment India are manufacturing partners.

Development

The Advanced Towed Artillery Gun System (ATAGS) project was started in 2013 by DRDO to replace older guns in service in the Indian Army with a modern 155mm artillery gun. DRDO laboratory Armament Research and Development Establishment (ARDE) partnered with private players Bharat Forge, Mahindra Defence Naval System, Tata Power SED and public sector unit Advanced Weapons and Equipment India for this purpose. With ARDE as the nodal laboratory, development is being assisted by Instruments Research and Development Establishment (IRDE), Vehicle Research and Development Establishment (VRDE), Proof and Experimental Establishment (PXE), Centre for Artificial Intelligence and Robotics (CAIR), and Defence Electronics Applications Laboratory (DEAL). It was part of the Development cum Production Partner programme (DCPP) of DRDO.

The development of the gun took about 4 years and is expected to be complete by March 2017. The delay in completion of the project was attributed to realization of ordnance and recoil system and supply issue with manufacturing of sub-systems. The gun is expected to start user trials in 2017 and production is expected to start in 2019.

It was first publicly showcased at 68th Republic Day parade on 26 January 2017. For the first time, an indigenously developed howitzer gun, the ATAGS was included in the 21 gun salute alongside the British origin 25-pounder as part of the 76th Independence day celebrations. Two howitzer were included in the battery that fired the 21 gun salute. ATAGS is being fast-tracked by Indian Army for induction as of 27 September 2022.

Design 
The gun consists of a barrel, breech mechanism, muzzle brake and recoil mechanism to fire 155 mm calibre ammunition with a firing range of 48 km. It has an all-electric drive to ensure reliability and minimum maintenance over a long period of time. It has advanced features like high mobility, quick deployability, auxiliary power mode, advanced communication system, automatic command and control system with night capability in direct-fire mode. The gun is two tons lighter than guns in the same category and is designed to provide better accuracy and range and is capable of firing five successive rounds in short duration. It is compatible with C3I systems like Artillery Combat Command and Control System (ACCCS) called Shakti for technical fire control, fire planning, deployment management, operational logistics management of the Indian Army.

Ramjet Propelled Artillery Shell 
IIT Madras along with IIT Kanpur, ARDE and Research Centre Imarat (RCI) are working on redesigning an existing 155 mm shell using ramjet propulsion that can cover 60 km+ range. It will be made compatible with ATAGS. The shell will use precision guidance kit for trajectory correction. IIT Madras will ensure that Munitions India can manufacture the shells.

Trials
DRDO conducted the proof firing of armament for the 155/52 calibre Advanced Towed Artillery Gun System on 14 July 2016. The test was successful.
Fully integrated, 155-millimeter artillery gun fired its first rounds of live ammunition at the Proof and Experimental Establishment (PXE) in Balasore, Odisha on 14 December 2016.
During trials in 2017, ATAGS broke the then world record for 155 mm/52 calibre gun by firing the round to a distance of 47.2 kilometres. It again registered a maximum distance of 48.074 kilometres with high explosive–base bleed (HE–BB) ammunition, surpassing the maximum ranges fired by any artillery gun system in this category. This has since been surpassed by M777 and later M1299 under US Extended Range Cannon Artillery (ERCA) program using 58 caliber long barrel, and XM1113 rocket-assisted artillery shell.
The gun successfully completed trials and the manufacturing of first lot of 40 guns is to start soon.
The gun underwent user trials in September 2020 and suffered a major setback with a barrel burst injuring four personnel. Investigations are on to ascertain and solve the problem and in November 2020, after an investigation the gun was cleared for further trials
In June 2021, ATAGS successfully completed trials at  altitude.
On May 2, 2022, the ATAGS successfully completed all field trials, paving way for induction into Army.

Variants 

 DRDO ATAGS - Towed by a High Mobility Vehicle (HMV)
 DRDO MGS - It equips ATAGS on an eight-wheeled HMV developed by Bharat Earth Movers Limited (BEML).

Users
The order will be split into lowest and second lowest bidder in 70:30 ratio to increase production rate.

See also
 List of equipment of the Indian Army

 Other wheeled artillery systems in use in different armies:
Archer
ATMOS 2000
A-222 Bereg
2S22 Bohdana
CAESAR
DANA
G6 Rhino
AHS Kryl
Nora B-52
PCL-09
PCL-161
PCL-181
PLL-09
Type 19 
ZUZANA

References

Field artillery
Artillery of India
155 mm artillery